Fred Kohler Jr. (July 8, 1911 – January 7, 1993) was an American actor who performed in a number of Westerns such as The Pecos Kid and Toll of the Desert. He played nearly 130 film and television roles between 1929 and 1978.

Kohler's father was actor Fred Kohler. Father and son appeared in two films together. In RKO's Lawless Valley, they played father and son outlaws. In one scene, Fred Jr.'s character says to his father's character, "Aw, that's crazy!", and Fred Sr. responds "Careful, son, you're talkin' to your dad, ya know!"

Selected filmography

Sweetie (1929) - Student Football Player (uncredited)
Maybe It's Love (1930) - Football Player (uncredited)
Renegades (1930) - Young Legionnaire (uncredited)
A Holy Terror (1931) - Party Guest (uncredited)
Bad Company (1931) - Yacht Guest (uncredited)
Devil and the Deep (1932) - Submarine Crewman (uncredited)
Movie Crazy (1932) - Young Actor in Waiting Room (uncredited)
70,000 Witnesses (1932) - Football Player (uncredited)
Pack Up Your Troubles (1932) - Doughboy (uncredited)
Afraid to Talk (1932) - Max - Elevator Operator (uncredited)
Laughter in Hell (1933) - Chain Gang Member (uncredited)
Corruption (1933) - Bud
This Day and Age (1933) - Student (uncredited)
Grand Old Girl (1935) - Bill Belden
The Pecos Kid (1935) - Donald Pecos - aka The Pecos Kid
Roaring Roads (1935) - Sam
Social Error (1935) - Jackson
Toll of the Desert (1935) - Bill Collins - aka Bill Carson
The Hoosier Schoolmaster (1935) - Bud Larkin
Paris in Spring (1935) - Collegian (uncredited)
Steamboat Round the Bend (1935) - Ben - Fleety Belle's Fiance (uncredited)
Red Salute (1935) - Student at Rally (uncredited)
Strike Me Pink (1936) - Student Bully (uncredited)
The Prisoner of Shark Island (1936) - Sgt. Cooper
Flash Gordon (1936, Serial) - Robot / Ming's Soldier (uncredited)
Sins of Man (1936) - Town Bully
Two-Fisted Gentleman (1936) - Conklin
Pigskin Parade (1936) - Biff Bentley
The Holy Terror (1937) - Carson
Roaring Timber (1937) - 'Curley'
Jungle Menace (1937, Serial) - Det. John Charles - alias Quinn [Chs. 5-6]
Life Begins in College (1937) - Bret
Prison Nurse (1938) - Miller
Flash Gordon's Trip to Mars (1938, Serial) - Martian Soldier (uncredited)
Meet the Girls (1938) - Sailor (uncredited)
Hold That Co-ed (1938) - Daly - Clayton Football Player (uncredited)
Lawless Valley (1938) - Jeff Marsh
Ride a Crooked Mile (1938) - Cpl. Bresline
 Texas Stampede (1939) - Wayne Cameron
Man of Conquest (1939) - Alamo Defender (uncredited)
Young Mr. Lincoln (1939) - Scrub White (uncredited)
Half a Sinner (1940) - Garage Owner (uncredited)
Two Gun Sheriff (1941) - Buck Keller - Henchman
Nevada City (1941) - Jim Trevor aka Black Bart
Sweetheart of the Campus (1941) - Football Player (uncredited)
Great Guns (1941) - Corporal (uncredited)
Bahama Passage (1941) - Mary's Naval Purser Friend (uncredited)
Dick Tracy vs. Crime, Inc. (1941, Serial) - House Heavy (uncredited)
Western Mail (1942) - Lucky Webster
Raiders of the Range (1942) - Plummer
Lone Star Ranger (1942) - Red
Boss of Hangtown Mesa (1942) - Henchman Clem
Lucky Jordan (1942) - Second Killer
China Girl (1942) - Flyer (uncredited)
No Time for Love (1943) - Sandhog (uncredited)
Hangmen Also Die! (1943) - Czech Patriot (uncredited)
Calling Wild Bill Elliott (1943) - John Culver
Colt Comrades (1943) - Henchman (uncredited)
Yanks Ahoy (1943) - Sailor Swabbing Deck (uncredited)
Appointment in Berlin (1943) - S.S. Guard (uncredited)
The Kansan (1943) - 1st Gate Guard (uncredited)
The Iron Major (1943) - Boston College Captain (uncredited)
There's Something About a Soldier (1943) - Military Policeman (uncredited)
See Here, Private Hargrove (1944) - Lieutenant (uncredited)
Up in Mabel's Room (1944) - Johnny (uncredited)
The Story of Dr. Wassell (1944) - Bosun's Mate - Evacuation (uncredited)
Mr. Winkle Goes to War (1944) - Sergeant (uncredited)
Frenchman's Creek (1944) - Pirate (uncredited)
The Big Bonanza (1944) - Henchman Roberts
Why Girls Leave Home (1945) - Ted Leslie
O.S.S. (1946) - Fireman (uncredited)
Dishonored Lady (1947) - First Motorcycle Cop (uncredited)
Unconquered (1947) - Sergeant (uncredited)
The Gallant Legion (1948) - Brent (uncredited)
Feudin', Fussin' and A-Fightin' (1948) - Emory Tuttle
Loaded Pistols (1948) - Bill Otis
The Gay Amigo (1949) - Brack
Hellfire (1949) - Card Player (uncredited)
Range Justice (1949) - Henchman Stoner
The House Across the Street (1949) - Cabbie at Accident (uncredited)
Tough Assignment (1949) - Grant
Samson and Delilah (1949) - Soldier at Temple (uncredited)
The Baron of Arizona (1950) - Demmings
Twilight in the Sierras (1950) - Henchman Mason
Two Lost Worlds (1951) - Nat Mercer - Sailor
Spoilers of the Plains (1951) - Henchman Brooks
The Red Badge of Courage (1951) - Veteran (uncredited)
The Greatest Show on Earth (1952) - Train Fireman (uncredited)
At Sword's Point (1952) - Regent Guard (uncredited)
Hoodlum Empire (1952) - German Soldier (uncredited)
Carbine Williams (1952) - Lathe Worker (uncredited)
Sky Full of Moon (1952) - Cowhand (uncredited)
Born to the Saddle (1953) - Jeff Sanger
Hollywood Thrill-Makers (1954) - Film Crew
Racing Blood (1954) - John Emerson
The Ten Commandments (1956) - Foreman
Daniel Boone, Trail Blazer (1956) - Kenton
Journey to Freedom (1957) - Detective
The Bonnie Parker Story (1958) - Dave Hiller - Rancher (uncredited)
Terror in a Texas Town (1958) - Weed (uncredited)
The Buccaneer (1958) - First Sergeant
Revolt in the Big House (1958) - Guard (uncredited)
Johnny Rocco (1958) - Glick (uncredited)
Alias Jesse James (1959) - James Gang Member #2
13 Fighting Men (1960) - Corey
The Adventures of Huckleberry Finn (1960) - Mate (uncredited)
Custer of the West (1967)
Ruby (1977) - Jake Miller
Mr. Too Little (1978) - Tramp

References

External links

American male film actors
American male television actors
People from Los Angeles
20th-century American male actors
1911 births
1993 deaths